"Love Forever" is Miliyah Kato's 15th single, released on May 13, 2009. It is a collaboration between fellow R&B/J-Pop singer Shota Shimizu, with whom Kato has previously collaborated with on the song "I'm Your Angel" from the album Tribute to Celine Dion.

On its first day the single debuted at #6. Three days later it would reach #1 and remain there for the rest of the week, becoming Kato's first single to reach #1 on the Oricon Daily Charts. The single would go on to debut at #5 on the Oricon Weekly Charts with first week sales of 34,094 copies, earning Kato her first Top 5 single and fourth Top 10. Within two weeks after its release, "Love Forever" became Kato's best selling single to date.

Track #3 is a cover of R. Kelly and Céline Dion's 1998 hit of the same name.

The single is certified Gold for shipment of 100,000 copies in Japan .

Track listing

Charts

2009 singles
Miliyah Kato songs
Billboard Japan Hot 100 number-one singles
Sony Music Entertainment Japan singles
2009 songs